The ISU Junior Grand Prix in Turkey (sometimes titled JGP Bosphorus) is an international figure skating competition. Sanctioned by the International Skating Union, it is held in the autumn in some years as part of the JGP series. Medals may be awarded in the disciplines of men's singles, ladies' singles, and ice dancing.

Junior medalists

Men

Ladies

Ice dancing

References

External links 
 ISU Junior Grand Prix at the International Skating Union
 Turkish Ice Skating Federation 

Turkey
JGP